The Slovak Football League is a national American Football league in Slovakia. The league was founded in 2011 by the Slovak Association of American Football; there are seven teams that compete in the league today.

Teams
Bratislava Monarchs
Cassovia Steelers
Nitra Knights
Trnava Bulldogs
Žilina Warriors
Zvolen Patriots

Former teams
Banská Bystrica Daemons
Smolenice Eagles
Topoľčany Kings

Champions

Historical Stats

References

External links
The Official Website of the Slovak Association of American Football

American football in Slovakia
American football leagues in Europe
Sports leagues established in 2011
Amer
2011 establishments in Slovakia